The Varendra rebellion (also known as the Kaivarta revolt) was the revolt against King Mahipala II led by Kaivarta chieftain Divya (Divvoka), a feudal lord of Northern Bengal. The Kaivartas were able to capture Varendra by this rebellion. The revolt might have been the first peasant revolt in Indian history. However, the description seems more appropriate to a rebellion of feudal lords(Samantas), who would have mobilized the peasants.

Identification of rebels 
The Vaṃśānucarita  of the Viṣṇu  Purāṇa mentioned that a  king  of  Magadha, having  overthrown  the traditionally accepted  kṣatriyas would  create  new category of  kṣatriyas. Romila Thapar notes that the  list  of  other  varṇas  converted  to  Kṣatriya  status through  this process  includes  the  Kaivarta. The Sultanpur copperplate inscription of the 5th century brings to light the presence of Kaivartaśarman in the local assembly (adhikaraṇa) as a member of Kuṭumbin (peasant landholders) in Gupta Bengal. Swapna Bhattacharya notes that in Varendra Kaivartas were represented not only as fishermen and cultivators, but Brahmins as well. R. C. Majumdar and RS Sharma mentioned the merger of this tribe or clan with Aryan or Brahmanical society and later getting affiliated with Mahishya, an offspring of Kshatriya father and Vaishya mother.

The name of Kaivartas appeared in  a grant of  Gopāla II as one of  the lowest categories of rural residents. There are reference to   vṛttis of Kaivartas like Osinnakaivartavṛtti, Uddhannakaivartavṛttivahikala, in the copperplates of  Mahīpāla I and Vigrahapāla III. According to Ryosuke Furui, these vṛttis or  lands, given for livelihoods or some services, connote their settling in agrarian frontier and the growth of some section to a class of landholders. The Kaivartas acquired the position of subordinate rulers through their association with the Pāla kings in the forms of military or other services and the appointment to administrative positions.

Background

It is hard to determine the causes and nature of the revolt. King Mahipala II arrested his two brothers Shurapala II and Rampala II in the time of ascending the throne. Soon the vassal chiefs rebelled, which was believed to be because of the weakened state of the central authority rather than the immediate actions of Mahipala II. When the king tried to counter with a small army, he was defeated and killed by a Kaivarta chieftain by the name Divya (or Divokka). Divya established a new dynasty in north Bengal for a  half century.

The Pala dynasty is known as golden age of Bengal. But after the golden age of Dharmapala and Devpala, the Pala emperors started to lose their glory. Their rule became weak and disorganisation broke out. The principal aim of the rebellion was to bring back the maintenance.

Uprising
Pala employee Divya called for revolution. The Kaivartas responded on his call and the rebels were easily able to capture the Varendra. As the Kaivartas were very expert in boating, they capitalised on naval war. Mahipala II was killed by the rebels and the Pala armies were forced to fall back. As a result, Varendra was declared a separate state by Divya. After the death of Divya, first Divya's brother Ruddoka and then Ruddoka's son Bhima were declared king of Varendra. The Kaivarta kings successfully ruled the region for around half a century. Bhima established himself as a successful and expert ruler. Bhima made the war-torn Varendra prosper. The Kaivarta pillar is still standing in Dinajpur of Bangladesh as a sign of the dynasty.

Recapture of Varendra
Seeing the prosperity of Varendra and popularity of Bhima, Rampala became worried after ascending the throne. He was afraid of losing more of Pala territory. Because of this, he managed the neighbouring vassals with a lot of money and property for assistance in the war. It was difficult for Bhima and the newly formed state Varendra to defend against the large combined army of Rampala. He was imprisoned at the north shore of the Ganges river while fighting. The Pala armies looted the countless treasures of Varendra.

When Bhima was imprisoned, his faithful worker Hari reorganised the army and attacked Rampala again. When Hari was on the verge of victory, Rampala enchanted him with wealth. Thus, the dream of the liberty of Varendra was spoiled and Varendra was again part of the Pala empire.

References

""বিদ্রোহী কৈবর্ত""। সত্যেন সেন

Bibliography

Pala Empire
Rebellions in Asia
Medieval rebellions